Bishop's Hatfield Girls' School is a girls' secondary academy school available for years 7 to Sixth Form. It is located in Hatfield, Hertfordshire in Wood's Avenue and was founded in 1960 as a girls' grammar school. According to Ofsted, it has a sixth form of about 120 students and the most recent report suggests the school as 'Outstanding'. As of September 2019, the Headteacher has been Mr Wood. In the 2016 OFSTED report it got an 'outstanding' rating.

Notable alumni
Tracey Thorn from Everything But The Girl studied at the school.
Diane Louise Jordan, television presenter
Sara Barnard, author

References

Academies in Hertfordshire
Girls' schools in Hertfordshire
Educational institutions established in 1960
1960 establishments in England
Secondary schools in Hertfordshire